Zaglossus robustus is an extinct species of long-beaked echidna known from the middle Miocene (about 13 or 14 million years ago) of Gulgong, New South Wales, Australia. It may belong in the genus Megalibgwilia. The supposed fossil platypus Ornithorhynchus maximus was based on a humerus of this species.

References

Further reading
 Australia's Lost World: Prehistoric Animals of Riversleigh by Michael Archer, Suzanne J. Hand, and Henk Godthelp (page 162)
 

Miocene mammals of Australia
Prehistoric monotremes
Fossil taxa described in 1895
Taxa named by William Sutherland Dun

simple:Long-beaked echidna#Zaglossus robustus